Dan Petrescu may refer to:

 Dan Petrescu (b. 1967), Romanian football manager and former player
 Dan Petrescu (businessman) (1953–2021), Romanian businessman and billionaire, one of the richest persons in Romania at the time
  (b. 1949), Romanian writer, essayist and translator